Sevanthi (Daisy) is a 2019 Indian Kannada language soap opera and romance drama which premiered on Udaya TV from 25 February 2019 starring Dhanya Deepika and Shishir Shastry in lead roles. It is the remake of the Tamil serial Roja.

Cast

Main
 Pallavi Gowda / Meghana Kushi / Dhanya Deepika as Sevanthi Arjun / Anuradha Arjun
 Shishir Shastry as Arjun Prathap Simha

Supporting
 Aishwarya Vinay as Priya / Fake Anuradha 
 Sangeetha Anil as Kalpana Prathap Simha 
 Abhijit Singh / Vinay Kashyap Simha as Ashwin Prathap Simha 
 Siri Raju / Prathiba Gowda / Pooja Lokapur as Pooja Ashwin 
 Bharathi Vishnuvardhan / Ashalatha as Pramoda Devi 
 Unknown / Roopashri as Yashodha Raghava 
 Rajesh Gowda as Raghava 
 Hamsa as Shantha Chandrakanth 
 Girish Vaidyanathan as Prathap Simha 
 Manjunath Bhat as Chandrakanth  
 Sowmya Rao Nadig / Unknown as Sakshi
 Roopa Prabhakar as Rathna 
 Krishna Adiga / Unknown as Shanthamurthy
 Unknown / Jyothi as Switzerland Sharada Devi

Cameo appearances
Srinagar Kitty as himself
 Shruti as herself
 Priyanka Upendra as herself
Narayana Swamy as Tippeshi: Priya's supposed father
Mangala as Nanjavva: Priya's supposed mother

Crossover and Special episodes
From 7 September 2020 to 11 September 2020 and from 2 November 2020 to 8 November 2020 it had a Mahasangama with Kasthuri Nivasa.
It aired a one-hour special episode on 29 August 2021.

Adaptations

References

2019 Indian television series debuts
Udaya TV original programming
Kannada-language television shows
Kannada-language television series based on Tamil-language television series